Sara language may refer to:

 Sara language (Indonesia), a language spoken in Kalimantan in Indonesia
 Sara languages, a family of Bongo–Bagirmi languages spoken mainly in southern Chad
Sar language, lingua franca of the regional capital of Sarh
Sara Gula language, a Bongo–Bagirmi language of Chad
Sara Kaba language, one of several local languages called Kaba or Sara
Sara Laka language, also known as Kabba Laka
Sara Mbay language, a Bongo–Bagirmi language of Chad and the Central African Republic
Sara Ngam language, a Bongo–Bagirmi language of Chad and the Central African Republic